Rachel John is a British actress, best known for her work in musical theatre.

In 2014 she joined the cast of Memphis as the alternate Felicia. She took over the role full-time for a whole two weeks of the run.

In 2016, she played the role of Nicki Marron in The Bodyguard during its limited return West End engagement, alongside Beverley Knight as Rachel Marron. John also played the role of Rachel Marron at certain performances, despite not being listed as an official understudy. She then moved with the production to the Ed Mirvish Theatre, Toronto for a limited season.

From November 2017 until she left in December 2018, she played Angelica Schuyler in the West End production of Hamilton.

She is a graduate of the University of Roehampton.

Personal life
John is a Christian. Having grown up in the church, she made the decision to be baptised at the age of 16.

References

1980 births
Living people
English stage actresses
English musical theatre actresses
English Christians